The Road of Bones is the eleventh studio album by the British neo-progressive rock band IQ, released on May 3, 2014. It peaked at number 36 in Germany on the Offizielle Deutsche Charts, number 62 in  Switzerland on the Swiss Hitparade and number 68 in the Netherlands on the Dutch Charts. It's the first album to feature Neil Durant on keyboards and it marks the return of original members Paul Cook on drums and Tim Esau on bass, the latter's first appearance on an IQ album since 1989.

The album marked a development in the band's sound, as they began to experiment with more aggressive musical passages, while maintaining their familiar earlier sound.

Track listing

Personnel
Peter Nicholls – lead and backing vocals
Mike Holmes – guitars
Neil Durant – keyboards
Tim Esau – basses and bass pedals
Paul Cook – drums and percussion

References

2014 albums
IQ (band) albums